Hyperaeschra georgica, the Georgian prominent, is a species of moth in the family Notodontidae (the prominents). It was first described by Gottlieb August Wilhelm Herrich-Schäffer in 1855 and it is found in North America and parts of Australia.

The MONA or Hodges number for Hyperaeschra georgica is 7917.

References

Further reading

External links

 

Notodontidae
Articles created by Qbugbot
Moths described in 1855